Chippewa Lake Park is an abandoned theme park once located in Chippewa Lake, Ohio, Medina County. It operated from 1878 through 1978, after the final owner, Continental Business Enterprises closed it due to a lack of attendance. After the park's closure, its rides and structures were left largely untouched and unmaintained for over 40 years.

History

Andrew's Pleasure Grounds: 1878–1898
In 1878, Edward Andrews organized a picnic ground and beach under the name Andrew's Pleasure Grounds. The park operated with some success, but its condition deteriorated. With the addition of a steam boat and the park's first rollercoaster, the amusement park was brought to life. The initial roller coaster had to be manually pushed up the track following each ride.

Chippewa Lake Park: 1898–1969
Mac Beach acquired Chippewa Lake in 1898 and improved the park immensely. He also placed a ban on liquor sales. Mac's son, Parker Beach, managed the park during its boom years: The Roaring '20s. During that decade, the first modern coaster  was built at the park, designed by Fred Pearce. Originally named the Big Dipper, it became better known as simply 'the coaster'. The park also featured a live band-stand seven nights a week. The park opened the wooden roller coaster in 1925. The coaster was a fairly small roller coaster, estimated to be about 50 Feet high. The coaster operated until the park closed in 1978. The coaster stood abandoned for over 30 years until it was demolished in 2010. 
The Beach family kept the park running successfully into the 1960s. Eventually, Chippewa Lake would feature three roller coasters, flying cages, a Ferris wheel, carousel, Tumble Bug, ballroom, and many other rides.

Resale and closure: 1969–1978
Chippewa Lake was acquired by Continental Business Enterprises in 1969, and the company developed plans to transform the park into more of a summer resort; these plans, however, drew very little public interest and funding and most of the plans were scrapped. The park would later close in 1978 - which was the park's centennial season - under the company's ownership, owing to factors like competition from nearby Cedar Point and the now defunct Geauga Lake amusement parks, as well as the decline of steel and rubber production in the surrounding areas. It was largely unknown to the public that the park's 100th season would be its last; the park closed rather secretly without any big media coverage or massive public outcry. When the park shut down, former owner Parker Beach made a request to his family that he be buried there when he died. In the 2007 documentary, "Welcome Back Riders", it is stated that although permission was never granted & although there were no formal papers, there is one lone gravestone in the park, at the very end of the documentary, it says Be respectful if you try to find Parker Beach's Grave. Let him enjoy his park in peace.    ...It's by the roller coaster.

Abandonment and deterioration: 1978–2008

After the park's closure in 1978, the land the park was situated on was left largely untouched and all of the rides and buildings were left standing, in which up until the end of the 1990s the park remained in fairly good condition and some of the rides were still usable. By the 2000s, however, large trees began growing through rides like the coaster and the park's ferris wheel, and several buildings had collapsed or been damaged by the effects of the elements. All of the structures in the park became rusted and rotted without any hopes of repairs.

List of Rides and Attractions:                         
 Big Dipper
 Ferris Wheel
 Miniature Railroad
 Carousel
 Fun House
 Tumble Bug
 Dodgem
 Little Dipper
 Himalaya 
 Flying Cages
 Caterpillar
 Flying Scooters
 Octopus
 Tilt A Whirl
 Rocket Ship 
 Wild Mouse

About 4:00 PM  on Thursday, June 13, 2002, the Chippewa Lake Park Ballroom burned down.

By 2008, several other buildings had suffered the ballroom's fate, including the hotel, arcade, fun house, peanut stand, and maintenance building, all of which had been damaged or destroyed by fire. However, other rides and structures still stood, in various states of disrepair. These included the coaster, the Wild Mouse, the Little Dipper, the Tumble Bug, and the frames of the Ferris Wheels and Flying Cages. Most other buildings across the park were in various states of collapse due to 30 years of neglect by this time.

In 2008, thirty years after the park's closure, the land the amusement park stood on was offered up for sale with an asking price of $3.5 million, and, according to the realtor's website, was sold. The page which indicated this was last updated on March 26, 2008.

The 2007 documentary film "Welcome Back Riders" featured Chippewa Lake Park.

The horror film Closed For the Season, shot in 2008 and released in 2010, had several scenes shot at the long-closed amusement park, and featured many of the park's derelict attractions as backgrounds.

Demolition: 2009–2010
On September 9, 2008, Chippewa Partners LLC announced plans for a development on the site called "Chippewa Landing" which was planned to include a hotel and spa, fitness center, restaurants, a conference and music center, small shops and other entertainment venues, that was expected to be completed sometime in 2010.

The site's structures, trees, and debris were being demolished and removed as of April 5, 2009, and the site was expected to be redeveloped after the completion of the work.  Tours of the property were available in Spring 2009, on Saturdays between 11 AM and 5 PM. Afterword, tours were only held on the second Saturday of every month (June 13 and July 11), between 11 AM and 5 PM.

As of June 14, 2010, the Hamburger Stand (Stand A) and half of the Big Dipper have been demolished.

As of June 19, 2010: the date of the final "tour" of the property; the hamburger stand and Big Dipper are gone.

The park today

As of April 18, 2012, the Chippewa Partners LLC's aforementioned plans for the site have been scrapped due to a lawsuit, and the Chippewa Lake Park property went into foreclosure.

As of August 2012, an attempt to auction off the property failed and foliage is starting to reclaim the park again.

As of Spring 2013, the Wild Mouse has been taken down.

In October 2013, an organization called Flying Cages stated their intention to attract investors to contribute to making the site an outdoor entertainment venue. The possibility exists that a few of the surviving rides might be preserved as icons of the past.

In October 2015 the current owners of the property have listed the property for sale for $3.7 million.

As of May 3, 2017, Chippewa Lake Park is still listed for sale.

On December 6, 2017, the Tom Sawyer steamboat was removed from the park and was transported down to Tennessee where it will be restored to operation. It was purchased by Jason Carver of J Beez Watercraft in 2009.

In 2020, it was announced that Chippewa Lake Park will be reborn as a Medina County park, which owns the adjacent 340-acre Chippewa Lake. The plan was to salvage what is left of the park, and use signage to detail the rich history of the area.

As of January 2023, the Ferris Wheel, the Little Dipper, the Flying Cages, and the Tumble Bug rides are still standing, along with sections of the train track and the remains of the ballroom and other structures. The cars of the Tumble Bug were removed and set aside, including one outside the fence, along with the gear lift mechanism to the coaster and some barrels.

References

External links

Chippewa Lake at Defunct Parks
Chippewa Lake Park Info at illicitohio.com
Documentary featuring Chippewa Lake Park

Buildings and structures in Medina County, Ohio
Defunct amusement parks in Ohio
Amusement parks in Ohio
1878 establishments in Ohio
1978 disestablishments in Ohio
Modern ruins